Shankar Jai Kishan 3 in 1 is a television show that aired on SAB TV. This show replaced Trideviyaan. The show starred Kettan Singh in three roles, Falaq Naaz, Kirtida Mistry and Chitrashi Rawat.

Plot
A person named Kishan (Kettan Singh) hides the fact of his two brothers' death from his mother, Savitri (Asawari Joshi), due to concerned about her health. As his two brothers look just like him, he disguises himself as his other two brothers and plays the roles of Kishan, as well as his two brothers, Jai and Shankar. His life takes a twist turn when his mother decides to get her three sons married. Kishan, now is helpless and taking the help of his friend, Babbar (Hemant Pandey) to cancel the wedding somehow. But the plan backfired because mostly of Pinchu, the brother of Dimple, Simple and Twinkle, and Shankar, Jai, Kishan who are actually three in one, had to marry Dr. Twinkle (Falaq Naaz), Dimple (Kirtida Mistry) and Simple (Chitrashi Rawat) respectively, who are actually sisters. Their father, Shammi Kapoor (Nimai Bali), who is also a friend to Kishan's father, who also looks like Kishan, bought a flat just in neighbourhood to Kishan's, which also created a quite tension for Kishan. Problems arise when Bhokal Baba (Daya Shankar Pandey) is proved wrong about the trio being one. He tries to reveal the fact, and thus Kishan has to face Bhokal Baba as well. There is also one neighbor of Kishan, Gupta Ji (Umesh Bajpai), who sits in his balcony all day long.

Cast
 Kettan Singh as four role Shankar Khanna, Jai Khanna,  Kishan Khanna & Shankar Jai Kishan Khanna (Shankar, Jai & Kishan's father)
 Asawari Joshi as Savitri Khanna: Shankar; Jai and Kishan's mother
 Falaq Naaz as Dr. Twinkle Kapoor
 Chitrashi Rawat as Simple Kapoor
 Kirtida Mistry as Dimple Kapoor
 Hemant Pandey as Babbar
 Nimai Bali as Shammi Kapoor
 Umesh Bajpai as Gupta Ji
 Sumeet Samnani as Pinchu Kapoor
 Daya Shankar Pandey as Bhaukaal Baba
 Himmanshoo A. Malhotra as Prem

References

2017 Indian television series debuts
2017 Indian television series endings
Hindi language television sitcoms
Sony SAB original programming
Swastik Productions television series